Ciarán McGuigan (born 8 December 1989) is a Northern Irish footballer who last played for Drogheda United of the League of Ireland.

Career
Ciarán is a Northern Irish footballer who started his career off with Glenavon in the IFA Premiership. He also had spells with Armagh City and was also linked with a few SPL teams including Motherwell.

Ciarán made his first-team league debut at the start of the 2010 season with Dundalk as a second-half substitute against Bray Wanderers on 5 March. In only his third league appearance, again as a substitute, he scored Dundalk's second goal in a 2–2 draw with Sligo Rovers on 5 April.

On 12 January 2011, McGuigan signed a one-year contract with Syrianska, with hopes of an extension after the season's end.

McGuigan signed for Drogheda United for the 2014 season

Move to America
He left Drogheda United after the 2014 season to work with his father in Brooklyn, New York. Ciaran currently plays for Lansdowne Bhoys FC of the Bronx, New York.

References

Living people
1989 births
League of Ireland players
Glenavon F.C. players
Armagh City F.C. players
Dundalk F.C. players
Drogheda United F.C. players
Syrianska IF Kerburan players
Association football defenders
Association footballers from Northern Ireland
Lansdowne Yonkers FC players